Anaïs Barbeau-Lavalette (born 1979) is a Canadian novelist, film director, and screenwriter from Quebec. Her films are known for their "organic, participatory feel." Barbeau-Lavalette is the daughter of filmmaker Manon Barbeau and cinematographer Philippe Lavalette, and the granddaughter of artist Marcel Barbeau.

Originally prominent as a child actor, her credits included the series Le Club des 100 Watts and À nous deux!. She later began making documentary films, including Les Petits princes des bidonvilles (2000), Buenos Aires, no llores (2001) and Si j'avais un chapeau (2005), before releasing her first feature film, The Ring, in 2007. In 2010, she also published Je voudrais qu'on m'efface (translated as Neighbourhood Watch), a novel which revolves around some of the same characters as The Ring. In 2015, her second novel, La femme qui fuit (translated as Suzanne), inspired by the life of her grandmother, artist Suzanne Meloche, was short-listed for the 2016 Governor General's Award for French-language fiction, in addition to winning a number of other prizes and being a best-seller.

Barbeau-Lavalette is best known to international audiences for her award-winning 2012 film Inch'Allah.

Early life 
Barbeau-Lavalette was born on February 8, 1979, in Montreal, the daughter of Manon Barbeau, a filmmaker and director, and Philippe Lavalette, a cinematographer. She is the granddaughter of the Canadian artist Marcel Barbeau, who studied under Paul-Émile Borduas, and is known for being one of the first non-figurative painters in Canada.

As a young adult, Barbeau-Lavalette lived and studied in the heavily disputed West Bank area.

In 2000, after finishing her first full-length documentary, Les Petits princes des bidonvilles (2000), Barbeau-Lavalette enrolled at the Université de Montréal, where she majored in International Studies. She then went on to study Film Production at the INIS. Following her time at INIS, Barbeau-Lavalette travelled to Ramallah, Palestine to attend Birzeit University.

Film career

Documentaries 
Barbeau-Lavalette started her film career as a documentary director. Following a year spent in Honduras, Barbeau-Lavalette directed Les Petits princes des bidonvilles (2000), which followed young Hondurans growing up in Montreal.  In 2002, Anaïs Barbeau-Lavalette represented Canada in the United Nation's Volunteers' Odyssey (Odyssée du voluntarist), in which she traveled the world creating 15 short documentaries on the theme of volunteerism.

On her return, Barbeau-Lavalette directed more documentaries, including the features Si j'avais un chapeau (2005), which detailed the lives of children across four different countries, and Tap-Tap, a "poetic portrait of Montreal's Haitian community."

Fiction features 
In 2007, her debut fiction The Ring came out and was received warmly by critics. Her second fiction feature film, Inch'Allah, has become her most recognizable piece of work.

Her 2020 film, Goddess of the Fireflies (La déesse des mouches à feu), is an adaptation of the novel by Geneviève Pettersen.

In 2022, she released White Dog (Chien blanc), an adaptation of Romain Gary's 1970 novel White Dog.

Short films 
Barbeau-Lavalette has created many short films spanning across different mediums and genres. Barbeau-Lavalette directed and shot 15 documentary short films during her time with the United Nation's Volunteers' Odyssey, and has continued to release short films throughout her career.

Her filmography includes such short films as Seven Hours Three Times A Year (2012), Ina Litovski (2012), and an 11-minute animated short film, Take Me (2014).

Videoclips 
Barbeau-Lavalette is part of the Wapikoni Mobile audiovisual adventure. Through this Barbeau-Lavalette has directed videoclips for musicians, including Canadian singers Catherine Major and Thomas Hellman and hip hop artists Samian and Dramatik.

Bibliography 

 Je voudrais qu'on m'efface (2010). Neighbourhood Watch, trans. Rhonda Mullins (Coach House, 2020).
 Embrasser Yasser Arafat : chroniques palestiniennes (2011).
 La Femme qui fuit (2015). Suzanne, trans. Rhonda Mullins (Coach House, 2017).

Awards and nominations 
Si j'avais un chapeau (2005) was nominated for the "Best Social Documentary and Best Research" at the Prix Gémeaux in 2006. Her feature film, Le Ring (2007) was extremely well received by critics. The critically acclaimed film, was chosen in the Pusan and Berlin film festivals in 2008. Le Ring received international awards including the New Talent Grand Prize and the Golden Lion Award at Taipei Film Festival, the Special Jury Award at Vladivostok Film Festival in Russia, and the Best Director Award at Miradas Madrid Film Festival.

A peace, human rights and international development activist, Barbeau-Lavalette was named artist of the year for 2012 by Les Artistes pour la paix, a Montreal-based organization that honors works of art involving themes of peace, in February 2013. In the same month, Inch'Allah was awarded the FIPRESCI Prize for the Panorama section of the 2013 Berlin International Film Festival.

References

External links

1979 births
Activists from Montreal
Canadian child actresses
Canadian television actresses
Canadian documentary film directors
Canadian women film directors
Canadian women novelists
Film directors from Montreal
Writers from Montreal
Actresses from Montreal
Living people
Canadian pacifists
Canadian human rights activists
Women human rights activists
21st-century Canadian novelists
Canadian women screenwriters
Canadian screenwriters in French
21st-century Canadian women writers
Canadian novelists in French
21st-century Canadian screenwriters
Best Director Jutra and Iris Award winners
Canadian women documentary filmmakers